Carol Cadwgan Lavell (born April 8, 1943) is an American equestrian. She was born in Newport, Rhode Island. Lavell won a bronze medal in team dressage at the 1992 Summer Olympics in Barcelona, together with Robert Dover, Charlotte Bredahl and Michael Poulin.

References

External links

1943 births
Living people
Sportspeople from Newport, Rhode Island
American female equestrians
American dressage riders
Olympic bronze medalists for the United States in equestrian
Equestrians at the 1992 Summer Olympics
Medalists at the 1992 Summer Olympics
Equestrians at the 1987 Pan American Games
Equestrians at the 2003 Pan American Games
Pan American Games gold medalists for the United States
Pan American Games silver medalists for the United States
Pan American Games medalists in equestrian
Medalists at the 1987 Pan American Games
Medalists at the 2003 Pan American Games
21st-century American women